The Yellow River Forest Park is a public park located on the northern bank of the Yellow River in the city of Jinan, Shandong, China. It is connected to the southern bank of the Yellow River and hence the urban center of Jinan via the Luokou pontoon bridge. On the opposite bank of the river lie the Jinan Hundred Miles Yellow River Scenic Area and downstream the Three Officials Temple Scenic Area.

See also
Jinan Hundred Miles Yellow River Scenic Area
Three Officials Temple Scenic Area
List of sites in Jinan

References

Tourist attractions in Jinan
Yellow River